Torbjörn Anders Nilsson (born 9 July 1954) is a Swedish former professional footballer who played as a striker. Considered one of the best Swedish footballers of all time, he is best remembered for his time with IFK Göteborg with which he won two Swedish championship titles, the 1981–82 UEFA Cup, and reached the semi-finals of the 1985–86 European Cup. He also represented PSV Eindhoven in the Netherlands and 1. FC Kaiserslautern in Germany during a career that spanned between 1971 and 1990. A full international between 1976 and 1985, he won 28 caps for the Sweden national team and scored nine goals. He represented his country at the 1978 FIFA World Cup and was the 1982 recipient of Guldbollen.

Playing career 
Nilsson was born in Västerås on 9 July 1954, and raised in Hallstahammar. He and his family (father Göte, mother Daisy, the brothers Rolf and Bosse and sister Rose-Marie) moved to Partille, outside Gothenburg, before he started school, and he began his footballing career in Jonsereds IF at the age of seven or eight. Nilsson joined IFK Göteborg for the 1975 season, and helped the club climb back to the top tier of Swedish football, Allsvenskan, by winning Division 2 in 1976. He tried his luck abroad with PSV Eindhoven, but returned to IFK after only one season. He then helped the team to a treble in 1982, the Swedish championship (IFK won both Allsvenskan and the title-deciding play-off), Svenska Cupen, and the UEFA Cup. He was awarded Guldbollen, the Swedish footballer of the year award, for his heroics.

Nilsson moved to Kaiserslautern in Germany, where he played two seasons, and was about to move to Benfica when his former Göteborg manager Sven-Göran Eriksson left that club. Instead, Nilsson moved home to Gothenburg and his former club. When he ended his playing career after three seasons due to knee problems, Nilsson had led the club to another Swedish Championship, and nearly a European Cup final in 1986. IFK was eliminated by FC Barcelona after having won the home leg 3–0. They lost the away match by the same score. Nilsson still regrets not taking a penalty in the ensuing penalty shootout, which forced two young and inexperienced players — Roland Nilsson and Per Edmund Mordt — to the spot. Both missed their penalties.

It is a mystery to a lot of Swedes how Nilsson with all his talent never really made it big when playing for PSV and Kaiserslautern, but according to himself he was too shy to make it in those rougher top club environments.

Despite Nilsson's so-so stays abroad, and his short career in the Swedish national team – for whom he played only 28 matches and scored nine goals – he is considered to be one of the greatest Swedish footballers of all time. He declined to play for the national team for four years in the early 1980s when he was at his prime, the most important reason for this was a conflict between him and the coach Lars Arnesson, who mixtured a lot with different formations, which did not suit the playing style that Nilsson liked. He instead concentrated on his club team, but made a comeback in the national team in 1984, scoring a goal in the 3–1 win against Portugal in the 1986 World Cup qualification. Nilsson was elected to the Swedish football Hall of Fame in 2003.

In a Sky Sports interview, March 2020, Sven Goran Eriksson said that Nilsson was the best striker he had ever managed.

Coaching career 
After ending his professional playing career, Torbjörn Nilsson acted as playing manager for his youth club Jonsereds IF, before becoming manager of Örgryte IS, then in Division 1, in 1991. The club was relegated to Division 2, but managed to advance two divisions into Allsvenskan the next year, thanks to the Swedish league system at the time. The luck did not last, however, and Örgryte was relegated from the highest league in 1993. Nilsson moved to IK Oddevold from Uddevalla, and brought the club to Allsvenskan for the first time in its history in 1995. He left his job after the season and did not take a new one for a year.

He then took the job as manager of Västra Frölunda IF in 1997, and for the third time coached a team to a promotion to Allsvenskan. He stayed as manager for Västra Frölunda for two seasons and led the club to a fifth and seventh place, the two best seasonal results the club has enjoyed. He took another one-year break before starting his fourth spell as manager for a Gothenburg club, BK Häcken, in 2001. He only stayed for one year, not being able to keep the club in the highest league. Instead he became the manager of the Sweden under-21 team, leading the team through a successful qualification to the 2004 UEFA U-21 Championship, where the team narrowly lost the semi-final and third place matches after penalty shootouts and extra time, respectively. He did not coach any team between 2004 and 2008, but then resumed his managerial career in Gothenburg's best women's team, Kopparbergs/Göteborg FC.

Career statistics

Club

International 

 Scores and results list Sweden's goal tally first, score column indicates score after each Nilsson goal.

Honours 
IFK Göteborg

 UEFA Cup: 1981–82
 Swedish Champion: 1982, 1984
Svenska Cupen: 1978–1979, 1981–82

Individual
Guldbollen: 1982
Allsvenskan top scorer: 1981
European Cup top scorer: 1984–85 (7 goals, shared with Michel Platini), 1985–86 (7 goals)
UEFA Cup top scorer: 1981–82 (9 goals)

Notes

References 

Swedish footballers
Swedish expatriate footballers
Allsvenskan players
IFK Göteborg players
PSV Eindhoven players
1. FC Kaiserslautern players
Bundesliga players
Expatriate footballers in the Netherlands
Expatriate footballers in Germany
1978 FIFA World Cup players
Swedish football managers
Örgryte IS managers
BK Häcken managers
Footballers from Gothenburg
Sportspeople from Västerås
1954 births
Living people
Sweden international footballers
IK Oddevold managers
Association football forwards
UEFA Cup winning players
UEFA Champions League top scorers